Leo Matthew Abraham (born 1977 in Camden, London) is an English musician, composer and producer. He has collaborated with a multitude of professional musicians, including Brian Eno, Katie Melua, Imogen Heap, Jarvis Cocker, Carl Barât, Regina Spektor, Jon Hopkins and Paul Simon. After attending the Royal Academy of Music in England, he started his musical career by touring as lead guitarist with Imogen Heap. Since 2005 he has released five solo albums, largely in an ambient style involving complex arrangements and a use of guitar-generated textures. He has also co-written or arranged a variety of film soundtracks, including Peter Jackson's 2009 release The Lovely Bones and Steve McQueen's Hunger.
Abrahams has produced Regina Spektor's album Remember Us to Life. Hayden Thorpe's Diviner, Editors' Violence and Ghostpoet's Dark Days + Canapés.

Career

Early Years
Abrahams was given an acoustic guitar by his parents at age 7, only to ignore the instrument for piano until age 12. As a teenager he played guitar in a succession of bands, also writing classical music. After high school, Abrahams attended the Royal Academy of Music with the goal of becoming a classical composer. While there, he studied under Steve Martland and Nick Ingman, only to become disillusioned, switching from the classical composition course to the commercial music course. During his studies, Abrahams was invited to join Imogen Heap's touring band, prompting him to leave the Royal Academy of Music to tour England for several months.

Collaborative Work
Through Heap, Abrahams was introduced to alternative folk artist Ed Harcourt, who Abrahams joined as a guitarist, playing lead guitar and scoring the instrumental parts on Harcourt's 2001 album Here Be Monsters, as well as Harcourt's subsequent albums. 

A couple of years later Abrahams had a fortuitous meeting with producer and ambient music pioneer Brian Eno in a Notting Hill guitar shop. Eno stated, "I spotted him trying out a guitar, the first I've ever seen in a guitar shop who wasn't playing 'Stairway to Heaven,' so I thought he must be good." Eno invited Abrahams to his studio, and Abrahams contributed guitar to Eno's album with J. Peter Schwalm, Drawn From Life, which was released in 2001. Abrahams went on to contribute instrumentals to a number of musicians produced by Eno, including Grace Jones, Seun Kuti, Nick Cave, and Paul Simon's 2006 album Surprise.

In 2010, Abrahams joined with long-time collaborators Jon Hopkins and Brian Eno to create the album Small Craft on a Milk Sea. The album is based largely on a two-week period of joint improvisation, as well as "several years of jams between the three of us", and is officially described as "a Brian Eno album featuring Leo Abrahams and Jon Hopkins."

As a guitarist he has played on over 100 records by artists including Florence and the Machine, Annie Lennox, Marianne Faithfull and Badly Drawn Boy. With David Holmes he contributed several instruments and co-wrote several tracks on Holmes' release The Holy Pictures.

Abrahams has written with and produced for a variety of musicians. He contributed additional production to David Byrne and Brian Eno's Everything That Happens Will Happen Today, co-writing the lead single "Strange Overtones". His production credits include Katie Melua, Wild Beasts, Paolo Nutini, Frightened Rabbit, Oscar and the Wolf, Hotei, Karl Hyde solo album, Diagrams, Josephine Oniyama, Carl Barât (of The Libertines), Chris Difford (of Squeeze), Brett Anderson (of Suede), Iarla O'Lionaird, Sparrow and the Workshop and Kill It Kid. He arranged the string sections for the 2003 album Silence is Easy by Starsailor, also conducting the orchestra at Abbey Road Studios.

He has played guitar for Pulp on their 2011–2012 reunion dates, although was not an official member of the band.

Solo Albums & Film Scores
Inspired by his work on the film score to the 2003 film Code 46, Abrahams created his first solo album in 2005: Honeytrap, released on Just Music. It relies primarily on ambient sounds generated exclusively by guitars, rejecting keyboard effects, sampling, computer effects, or keyboards. The BBC referred to the album as "subtle, imaginative and sometimes intoxicatingly lovely." Scene Memory (2006), his second solo album, was also in an ambient style, with sounds created entirely by playing electric guitars through chains of laptop effects. A Boomkat review stated "Abrahams blends piano, guitar, and electronics to an almost euphoric effect – the record feels like you are walking in a dream." Sea of Tranquility reviewed the album saying "he respects a certain level of restraint – the solo guitar- putting into sharp relief the...limitless opportunities for the resultant sounds and form. This work is thoughtful, adventurous, and the result of a high degree of artistic integrity."

His third album, the 2007 The Unrest Cure, was initially built out of sessions in New York with David Holmes' rhythm section. Brian Eno, KT Turnstall, Ed Harcourt, Foy Vance, Pati Yang, Merz, Phoebe Legere, Kari Kleiv, and poet Bingo Gazingo also contributed to the album. It involves heavier guitar lines than the previous two albums. On his 2008 album Grape and the Grain, Abrahams continued to use English Folk themes, mainly with pieces featuring guitar, added instrumentation such as cello and medieval lute, and occasionally a hurdy-gurdy, which he learnt to play for the record.

He has released two further EPs on the Just Music label, and also released a vocal-based record on One Little Indian in 2011.

He has co-written or arranged a variety of film soundtracks, including Peter Jackson's 2009 release The Lovely Bones with Brain Eno, Steve McQueen's award-winning Hunger with David Holmes, Seeking 1906 with Simon Winchester, Gardens of Paradise, The Graduates, After Happily Ever After, and also on the Oceans series with David Holmes.

Discography

Solo Albums
 Honeytrap (2005)
 Scene Memory (2006)
 The Unrest Cure (2007)
 The Grape and the Grain (2008)
 Daylight (2015)

EPs and Singles
 EP1 (2006)
 Searching 1906 (2006)
 December Songs (2009)
 Zero Sum (2013)

Collaborations
2000: "Last of England" by Sex Gang Children – composer, producer, all instruments
2001: Here Be Monsters by Ed Harcourt – guitar/string arrangements, guitar
2003: From Every Sphere by Ed Harcourt – orchestral arrangements, guitar/keyboard
2003: Silence is Easy by Starsailor (#2 UK) – string arrangements
2005: How the Mighty Fall by Mark Owen (#78 UK) – co-writer
2005: Elephant's Graveyard by Ed Harcourt – string/wind arrangements
2006: Madman in the Basket by Andi Sex Gang – production, guitars
2006: Musikain by J. Peter Schwalm – guitars
2007: Inventing New Destruction by Andi Sex Gang – laptop guitars
2008: Everything That Happens Will Happen Today with David Byrne/Brian Eno (#1 CMJ) – production, various instrumentals
2008: The Redcastle Sessions with Cara Dillon – co-production, guitars, piano, percussion
2008: The Holy Pictures with David Holmes – guitar, bass, various keyboards, marxophone and hurdy gurdy
2009: Slow Attack by Brett Anderson – co-writer, producer
2009: Come to Life by Natalie Imbruglia – additional production, guitar
2009: Frozen Heart by Smoke Fairies – production, keys
2009: Portraits of the Artists by Foy Vance – producer, co-writer, arranger, guitar, piano
2010: Ghosts by Smoke Fairies – producer
2010: Small Craft on a Milk Sea with Brian Eno and Jon Hopkins – co-writer, co-producer, guitar, guitaret, laptop
2010: Carl Barât by Carl Barât – co-writer, technical, guitar, mini-piano, omnichord, guitorgan, bass
2011: Death Fires by Carl Barât – producer, co-writer, arranger, guitar, piano
2011: Black Rainbows by Brett Anderson – co-writer, producer, guitar
2011: John Martyn Tribute by Paolo Nutini – producer, arranger, guitar, piano
2011: Cashmere If You Can by Chris Difford – producer, co-writer, arranger, guitar, piano
2011: Spitting Daggers by Sparrow and the Workshop – producer
2011: Foxlight by Iarla O'Lionaird – producer
2011: From Africa with Fury by Seun Kuti – producer
2011: Outside by Aisha Orazbayeva – producer/editor
2012: State Hospital (EP) by Frightened Rabbit – producer
2012: Portrait by Josephine Oniyama –  co-writer, producer, instruments
2013: Pedestrian Verse by Frightened Rabbit – producer
2013: Edgeland by Karl Hyde – producer, co-writer
2013: EP by Olivia Chaney – producer
2014: Entity by Oscar and the Wolf – additional production and mix
2014: The Hand Gallery by Aisha Orazbayeva – engineer 
2014: Present Tense by Wild Beasts – co-producer, session musician 
2014: Caustic Love by Paolo Nutini – co-writer, co-producer, guitar, keyboards, programming, Wurlitzer, string and horn arrangement (Superfly)
2014: Lurrean etzanda by Ruper Ordorika – guitar
2014: New Beginnings by Hotei – co-writer, producer
2015: My Dreams Dictate My Reality by Soko – producer, engineering, guitar, hurdy-gurdy
2015: The Fade In Time by Sam Lee – mixed
2016: Remember Us To Life by Regina Spektor – producer
2016: EP ’S' by Emmy The Great - co-writer
2017: Silver Eye by Goldfrapp - programming
2017: Al Jamilat by Yasmine Hamdan - co-producer
2017: Dark Days and Canapés by Ghostpoet - co-writer, producer
2018: Violence by Editors - producer
2018: Songs You Make At Night by Tunng - co-mixer
2019: Diviner by Hayden Thorpe - producer, guitar, keyboards
2020: Album No. 8 by Katie Melua - producer, instruments

Soundtracks
2007: Searching 1906 – writer, performer
2009: Five Minutes of Heaven – co-writer with David Holmes
2009: Hunger – co-writer with David Holmes
2009: The Lovely Bones – co-writer with Brian Eno, guitar
2010: Yohan: The Child Wanderer'' – orchestrator
2011 'After Happily Ever After' – composer
2012: "Gardens of Paradise" – composer
2012: "The Graduates/Los Graduados" – composer
2013: "The Outer Edges (Edgeland)" – composer

References

External links

Solar Management

1977 births
Living people
People from the London Borough of Camden
English record producers
English folk guitarists
English male guitarists
English session musicians
English film score composers
English male film score composers
Alumni of the Royal Academy of Music
21st-century British guitarists
21st-century British male musicians